John McPherson (1860–1897), was the first Labor Party leader of South Australia.

John McPherson may also refer to:

John R. McPherson (1833–1897), United States Senator from New Jersey
John Bayard McPherson (1846–1919), United States federal judge
John McPherson (Clydesdale footballer) (fl. 1875), Scottish footballer
John McPherson (footballer, born 1855) (1855–1934), Scottish footballer
John McPherson (footballer, born 1867) (1867–?), Scottish footballer
John McPherson (footballer, born 1868) (1868–1926), Scottish footballer
John McPherson (baseball) (1869–1941), American baseball player
John McPherson (Canadian politician) (1855–1944), Canadian politician, MLA for Stony Plain, Alberta, 1905–1913
John McPherson (cartoonist), creator of the syndicated comic strip Close to Home
John McPherson (cinematographer) (1941-2007), American cinematographer

See also
John MacPherson (disambiguation)